This is a list of former (or historical) Serbian language exonyms for towns and villages in the Vojvodina region of Serbia. List includes former names of modern settlements as well as names of former settlements that either ceased to exist either were joined with other settlements.

Former names of modern settlements
Modern name - former name (former Cyrillic name):
 Adorjan - Nadrljan (Надрљан)
 Aleksandrovo - Banatsko Aleksandrovo (Банатско Александрово), Livade (Ливаде), Velike Livade (Велике Ливаде)
 Bačka Palanka - Palanka (Паланка), Stara Palanka (Стара Паланка), Nova Palanka (Нова Паланка), Nemačka Palanka (Немачка Паланка)
 Bački Brestovac - Brestovac (Брестовац)
 Bački Gračac - Filipovo (Филипово), Filipovo Selo (Филипово Село)
 Bački Jarak - Jarak (Јарак)
 Bački Petrovac - Petrovac (Петровац)
 Bački Vinogradi - Kraljev Breg (Краљев Брег)
 Bačko Dobro Polje - Bačko Dobro (Бачко Добро), Pribićevićevo (Прибићевићево), Mali Ker (Мали Кер)
 Bačko Dušanovo - Dušanovac (Душановац), Dušanovo (Душаново)
 Bačko Gradište - Feldvarac (Фелдварац)
 Banatska Dubica - Dubica (Дубица), Margitica (Маргитица), Mala Margita (Мала Маргита)
 Banatski Brestovac - Brestovac (Брестовац)
 Banatski Dvor - Banatski Dušanovac (Банатски Душановац), Zvarnjak (Зварњак)
 Banatsko Veliko Selo - Veliko Selo (Велико Село), Šarlevil (Шарлевил), Šarlevit (Шарлевит), Soltur (Солтур), Sveti Hubert (Свети Хуберт)
 Barice - Borovice (Боровице), Sveti Jovan (Свети Јован)
 Bečej - Stari Bečej (Стари Бечеј)
 Bogojevo - Gomboš (Гомбош)
 Budisava - Tisa Kalmanfalva (Тиса Калманфалва) 
 Bukovac - Bukovica (Буковица)
 Busenje - Vladičino Selo (Владичино Село)
 Čelarevo - Čib (Чиб), Čeb (Чеб), Bač-Čeb (Бач-Чеб)
 Češko Selo - Fabijan (Фабијан), Ablijan (Аблијан)
 Despotovo - Despot Sveti Ivan (Деспот Свети Иван), Despot Sent Ivan (Деспот Сент Иван), Vasilevo (Василево), Vasiljevo (Васиљево)
 Dobričevo - Dobrićevo (Добрићево)
 Dolovo - Veliko Dolovo (Велико Долово), Malo Dolovo (Мало Долово)
 Dužine - Sečenovo (Сеченово)
 Ečka - Pavlovci (Павловци), Pavlovo (Павлово), Pavlovo Ečka (Павлово Ечка)
 Elemir - Srpski Elemir (Српски Елемир), Gornji Elemir (Горњи Елемир), Nemački Elemir (Немачки Елемир)
 Futog - Stari Futog (Стари Футог), Novi Futog (Нови Футог)
 Gložan - Gložanj (Гложањ), Gložani (Гложани)
 Gudurica - Kutrica (Кутрица)
 Gunaroš - Gunaraš (Гунараш)
 Janošik - Slovački Aleksandrovac (Словачки Александровац)
 Jaša Tomić - Modoš (Модош), Veliki Modoš (Велики Модош), Mali Modoš (Мали Модош), Srpski Modoš (Српски Модош), Nemački Modoš (Немачки Модош)
 Kačarevo - Kraljevićevo (Краљевићево)
 Kanjiža - Stara Kanjiža (Стара Кањижа)
 Kikinda - Velika Kikinda (Велика Кикинда)
 Kljajićevo - Krnjaja (Крњаја)
 Knićanin - Knićaninovo (Книћаниново), Rudolfsgnad (Рудолфсгнад)
 Kovačica - Antalfalva (Анталфалва)
 Kovilj - Gornji Kovilj (Горњи Ковиљ), Donji Kovilj (Доњи Ковиљ)
 Krajišnik - Šupljaja (Шупљаја)
 Kruščić - Veprovac (Вепровац)
 Kula - Bačka Kula (Бачка Кула)
 Kupinik - Aleksandrov Gaj (Александров Гај)
 Kupinovo - Kupinik (Купиник)
 Lazarevo - Lazarfeld (Лазарфелд)
 Lokve - Sveti Mihajlo (Свети Михајло)
 Lovćenac - Sekić (Секић)
 Lukićevo - Martinica (Мартиница), Margitica (Маргитица), Žigmondfalva (Жигмондфалва)
 Maglić - Buljkes (Буљкес), Kezi (Кези), Šavolj-Kezi (Шавољ-Кези)
 Male Pijace - Mala Pijaca (Мала Пијаца)
 Mali Iđoš - Iđoš (Иђош)
 Markovićevo - Kriva Bara (Крива Бара)
 Međa - Pardanj (Пардањ), Srpski Pardanj (Српски Пардањ), Totovski Pardanj (Тотовски Пардањ), Nemački Pardanj (Немачки Пардањ), Mađarski Pardanj (Мађарски Пардањ), Ninčićevo (Нинчићево)
 Mladenovo - Bukin (Букин)
 Neuzina - Srpska Neuzina (Српска Неузина), Hrvatska Neuzina (Хрватска Неузина)
 Novi Bečej - Bečej (Бечеј), Turski Bečej (Турски Бечеј)
 Novi Kneževac - Nova Kanjiža (Нова Кањижа), Turska Kanjiža (Турска Кањижа) 
 Novi Kozarci - Hajfeld (Хајфелд), Mastort (Масторт)
 Novi Kozjak - Ferdin (Фердин)
 Novi Sad - Racka Varoš (Рацка Варош), Petrovaradinski Šanac (Петроварадински Шанац), during World War II: Ujvidek (Ујвидек)
 Novo Miloševo - Banatsko Miloševo (Банатско Милошево), Dragutinovo (Драгутиново), Beodra (Беодра)
 Njegoševo - Njeguševo (Његушево)
 Opovo - Opava (Опава)
 Ostojićevo - Potiski Sveti Nikola (Потиски Свети Никола)
 Padina - Lajošfalva (Лајошфалва)
 Plandište - Veliko Plandište (Велико Пландиште), Zičidorf (Зичидорф), Morminta (Морминта), Mariolana (Мариолана)
 Prigrevica - Prigrevica Sveti Ivan (Пригревица Свети Иван)
 Radojevo - Klarija (Кларија)
 Ratkovo - Parabuć (Парабућ)
 Ravni Topolovac - Katarina (Катарина)
 Ravno Selo - Šove (Шове), Stare Šove (Старе Шове), Nove Šove (Нове Шове)
 Sivac - Stari Sivac (Стари Сивац), Novi Sivac (Нови Сивац)
 Srbobran - Sentomaš (Сентомаш)
 Sremska Kamenica - Kamenica (Каменица)
 Sremska Mitrovica - Mitrovica (Митровица)
 Srpska Crnja - Crnja (Црња), Nemačka Crnja (Немачка Црња)
 Straža - Lagerdorf (Лагердорф)
 Subotica - Sabatka (Сабатка)
 Sutjeska - Sarča (Сарча), Nova Sarča (Нова Сарча)
 Tomislavci - Orešković (Орешковић)
 Torak - Begejci (Бегејци), Veliki Torak (Велики Торак), Mali Torak (Мали Торак)
 Torda - Vujićevo (Вујићево)
 Trešnjevac - Senćanski Trešnjevac (Сенћански Трешњевац), Uzunovićevo (Узуновићево)
 Utrine - Nedićevo (Недићево)
 Višnjićevo - Grk (Грк)
 Vrbas - Stari Vrbas (Стари Врбас), Novi Vrbas (Нови Врбас)
 Zimonić - Voja Zimonić (Воја Зимонић)
 Zmajevo - Pašićevo (Пашићево), Stari Ker (Стари Кер), Ker (Кер), Bačka Dobra (Бачка Добра)
 Zrenjanin - Bečkerek (Бечкерек), Veliki Bečkerek (Велики Бечкерек), Petrovgrad (Петровград)
 Žitište - Begej Sveti Đurađ (Бегеј Свети Ђурађ)

Names of former settlements that ceased to exist
 Almaš (Алмаш), former village in Bačka
 Alpar (Алпар), former village in Bačka
 Crno Brdo (Црно Брдо), former village in Bačka 
 Molin (Молин), former village in Banat
 Terjan (Терјан), former village in Banat

Names of former settlements that were joined with other settlements
 Andrejevac (Андрeјевaц), today part of Aradac
 Banatski Dušanovac (Банатски Душановац), today part of Banatski Dvor
 Belo Polje (Бело Поље), today part of Deronje
 Bikač (Бикач) or Veliki Bikač (Велики Бикач), today part of Bašaid 
 Čarnojevićevo (Чарнојевићево), today part of Rusko Selo
 Kruševlje (Крушевље), today part of Gakovo 
 Mala Đala (Мала Ђала), today part of Horgoš 
 Mužlja (Мужља) or Gornja Mužlja (Горња Мужља), today part of Zrenjanin  
 Obilićevo (Обилићево), today part of Novi Kneževac  
 Rusanda (Русанда), today part of Melenci
 Tankosićevo (Танкосићево), today part of Kisač
 Vasiljevo (Васиљево), today part of Horgoš 
 Vojvoda Bojović (Војвода Бојовић), today part of Srpska Crnja
 Vojlovica, today part of Pančevo
 Vranjevo (Врањево), today part of Novi Bečej

See also 
 Serbian exonyms
 List of European exonyms
 List of cities, towns and villages in Vojvodina

References
Borislav Jankulov, Pregled kolonizacije Vojvodine u XVIII i XIX veku, Novi Sad - Pančevo, 2003.

Voljvodina, exonyms
Serbian exonyms in Vojvodina
Exonyms
Serbian